Burlingame may refer to:

People
Alvah W. Burlingame Jr. (1879–1952), New York politician
Anson Burlingame, 19th-century American diplomat; a US-China treaty was named after him, along with towns in California and Kansas
Charles Burlingame, the pilot of American Airlines Flight 77 before it was hijacked and flown into the Pentagon on 9/11
Creed Burlingame, United States Navy submarine commander during World War II
Debra Burlingame, sister of Charles Burlingame and World Trade Center Memorial Foundation board member
Emeline S. Burlingame (1836-1923; pen name, "Aunt Stomly"), American editor, evangelist, suffragist
Frank Burlingame, American professional baseball umpire
Hardin Jasper Burlingame (1852–1915), American magician and magic historian
Jeff Burlingame, American author and editor
Merrill G. Burlingame (1901–1994), Professor of History, Montana State University

Places
 Burlingame, California, United States
 Burlingame High School (California)
 Burlingame station on the Caltrain railway line
 Burlingame, San Diego, a neighborhood of San Diego, California
 Burlingame, Kansas, United States
 Burlingame High School (Kansas)
 Burlingame State Park, Rhode Island, United States
 Burlingame, Portland, Oregon, a neighborhood

Other
Burlingame Treaty, an 1868 treaty between the United States and China